James Milo Newman (born James Myron Newman; January 22, 1992) is an American actor. He played Tony Schneider on the US MTV television teen drama Skins. Newman's first acting experience was auditioning for Skins. He had previously planned to fight in the Golden Gloves boxing tournament (he had once boxed with Yuri Foreman).

Personal life 
Newman was raised in Greenwich Village, New York. He is the son of actress Antonia Beresford Dauphin and producer Peter Ross Newman. His maternal grandmother, Ruda Dauphin (née Podemska), was the president of film production company Odeon International.

His maternal grandfather was English novelist Marc Brandel, the son of writer J. D. Beresford. His parents had a Jewish wedding. His brother is actor Griffin Newman.

For years he attended Camp Greylock in Massachusetts.

Newman has not appeared in television or film since the cancellation of Skins and currently works in sports recruitment in France.

Filmography
Skins: Reverse Party (2011) (Tony Schneider)
Skins Webisodes (2011) (Tony Schneider) (4 episodes)
Skins (2011) (Tony Schneider) (10 episodes)

References

External links 
 

1992 births
Living people
21st-century American male actors
American male television actors
Jewish American male actors
Male actors from New York City
People from Greenwich Village
21st-century American Jews